Aaron Popoola (born 22 March 1942) is a former Ghanaian boxer. He participated in the 1968 Olympics, where he lost in the second round to Turkish Celal Sandal. He participated in the 1962 British Empire and Commonwealth Games and 1966  Commonwealth Games, winning silver medal in 1966 after losing to Jim McCourt.

1968 Olympic results
Below is the record of Aaron Popoola, a Ghanaian welterweight boxer who competed at the 1968 Mexico City Olympics:

 Round of 64: bye
 Round of 32: lost to Celal Sandal (Turkey) by decision, 2-3

References

External links
 

1942 births
Ghanaian male boxers
Boxers at the 1968 Summer Olympics
Olympic boxers of Ghana
Boxers at the 1962 British Empire and Commonwealth Games
Boxers at the 1966 British Empire and Commonwealth Games
Commonwealth Games silver medallists for Ghana
Commonwealth Games medallists in boxing
Boxers from Accra
Living people
Welterweight boxers
Medallists at the 1966 British Empire and Commonwealth Games